Jože Brodnik (born 26 April 1936 in Šmarje pri Jelšah) is a Slovenian retired decathlete who competed in the 1960 Summer Olympics representing Yugoslavia.

He began his athletics career in 1952 at 16, competing for the Kladivar Club in Celje, and went on to become a Slovenian, Yugoslav and Balkan record holder in the decathlon, representing Yugoslavia 11 times. He was a five-time Yugoslav national champion in the decathlon and was also Slovenian champion in the high jump three times, javelin throw and decathlon twice, and 110 metres hurdles, 400 metres hurdles and pole vault once.

Brodnik won the 1959 Mediterranean Games title in Beirut, Lebanon, with 6581 points, at the time a Games record. The following year, Brodnik finished ninth in the decathlon at the 1960 Olympic Games in Rome, scoring 6918 points. 

He competed at the European Championships twice, finishing ninth in 1958 and eighth in 1962.

Personal bests
100 metres: 11.3h, Belgrade, Serbia, 13 September 1962
400 metres: 51.0h, Rome, Italy, 5 September 1960
1500 metres: 4:27.4h, Belgrade, Serbia, 14 September 1962
110 metres hurdles: 15.4h, Belgrade, Serbia, 14 September 1962
High Jump: 1.83m, Belgrade, Serbia, 13 September 1962
Pole Vault: 4.10m, Rome, Italy, 6 September 1960
Long Jump: 6.91m, Rome, Italy, 5 September 1960
Shot Put: 13.18m, Stockholm, Sweden, 20 August 1958
Discus Throw: 39.25m, Belgrade, Serbia, 14 September 1962
Javelin Throw (old model): 65.30m, Rome, Italy, 6 September 1960
Decathlon (1962-1984 scoring tables): 7183, Belgrade, Serbia, 14 September 1962		
* from the athlete's World Athletics profile

Post-athletics career
Brodnik served as the first director of DARS, the Motorway Company in the Republic of Slovenia (Družba za avtoceste v Republiki Sloveniji), from 1994-1999.

Brodnik served as the president of the Athletics Federation of Slovenia from 1997 to 2001.

References

External links

1936 births
Living people
Slovenian decathletes
Yugoslav decathletes
Olympic athletes of Yugoslavia
Athletes (track and field) at the 1960 Summer Olympics
Slovenian male athletes
Yugoslav male athletes
People from the Municipality of Šmarje pri Jelšah
Mediterranean Games gold medalists for Yugoslavia
Mediterranean Games medalists in athletics
Athletes (track and field) at the 1959 Mediterranean Games